Christian Holm is the name of:

Christian Holm (Norwegian politician) (1783-1855)
Christian Holm (painter) (1804-1846), Danish animal painter
Christian Hintze Holm (born 1964), Norwegian politician
Christian Holm (Swedish politician) (born 1976)
Christian Holm (Scouting)
Christian Holm (German Theoretical Physicist)